Oecomys superans, also known as the large oecomys or foothill arboreal rice rat, is a species of rodent in the genus Oecomys of family Cricetidae. It is found along the eastern slope of the Andes in southern Colombia, Ecuador, and Peru and east into the Amazon basin, including parts of Brazil. Its distribution is poorly known, and it may also occur further south, into Bolivia.

References

Literature cited
Musser, G.G. and Carleton, M.D. 2005. Superfamily Muroidea. Pp. 894–1531 in Wilson, D.E. and Reeder, D.M. (eds.). Mammal Species of the World: a taxonomic and geographic reference. 3rd ed. Baltimore: The Johns Hopkins University Press, 2 vols., 2142 pp. 
Weksler, M. and Tirira, D. 2008. . In IUCN. IUCN Red List of Threatened Species. Version 2009.2. <www.iucnredlist.org>. Downloaded on December 2, 2009.

Oecomys
Mammals described in 1911
Taxa named by Oldfield Thomas
Taxonomy articles created by Polbot